During the 2004–05 English football season, Brentford competed in Football League One. In his first full season as manager, Martin Allen's "two bob team" reached the 2005 Football League play-off semi-finals and the fifth round of the FA Cup.

Season summary

After pulling off "The Great Escape" from relegation at the end of the 2003–04 season, Brentford manager Martin Allen signed a three-year contract and assembled a "two bob" squad of veterans, youngsters and non-league footballers on free transfers. The club was £7 million in debt and facing annual interest payments on its overdraft of £300,000. The season was punctuated by bizarre motivational challenges set by Allen, which stretched from ordering the players to prepare their own lunch to swimming in rivers before cup ties. Brentford opened the season with three wins and three losses and though the Bees exited the League Cup and the Football League Trophy at the first attempts, a run of five wins in eight matches through to mid-October had the club rooted in the automatic promotion places in League One. Though Brentford won just four matches in all competitions during the final two months of 2004, the club managed to remain in the top 10 in League One.

Victory over Walsall in the first match at Griffin Park of 2005 began a spell in which the Bees lost just three of the following 21 matches, with one of the defeats coming in an FA Cup fifth round replay at home to Southampton, which ended a memorable run that earned the club over £500,000 in match revenues. Postponements due to the cup run gave Brentford up to three games in hand from February through March and the club broke back into the playoff positions on 12 April after a 1–0 win over Tranmere Rovers, still with a game in hand. Consecutive defeats to Bradford City, Huddersfield Town and Luton Town in April dropped the Bees outside the playoff places, but a late 2–1 comeback victory away to Wrexham in the penultimate match (the final game in hand) confirmed a place in the playoffs. Martin Allen selected a predominantly youth and reserve lineup for the final match of the league season versus already-promoted Hull City and the experimental team secured a 2–1 victory and a 4th-place finish in League One. Despite finishing 4th, the 9 goals conceded during the three defeats in April saw Brentford finish the season with a goal difference of −3.

Brentford met 5th-place Sheffield Wednesday in the 2005 League One playoffs, but a 1–0 defeat in the first leg at Hillsborough left the Bees with a mountain to climb and despite an improved performance in the second leg at Griffin Park, the team crumbled and conceded twice to effectively end the tie, before Andy Frampton grabbed a late consolation.

League table

Results
Brentford's goal tally listed first.

Legend

Pre-season

Football League One

Football League play-offs

FA Cup

Football League Cup

Football League Trophy

 Sources: Soccerbase, 11v11

Playing squad 
Players' ages are as of the opening day of the 2004–05 season.

 Source: Soccerbase

Coaching staff

Statistics

Appearances and goals
Substitute appearances in brackets.

 Players listed in italics left the club mid-season.
 Source: Soccerbase

Goalscorers 

 Players listed in italics left the club mid-season.
 Source: Soccerbase

Discipline

 Players listed in italics left the club mid-season.
 Source: ESPN FC

International caps

Management

Summary

Transfers & loans

Kit

|
|
|

Awards 
 Supporters' Player of the Year: Sam Sodje
 Players' Player of the Year: Michael Turner
 Most Improved Player of the Year: Kevin O'Connor
 Football League One Manager of the Month: Martin Allen (September 2004)
 Evening Standard Player of the Month: Sam Sodje (February 2005)
FA Cup Goal of the Round: Isaiah Rankin (fifth round)

References

Brentford F.C. seasons
Brentford